The 2020 Texas Southern Tigers football team represented Texas Southern University in the 2020–21 NCAA Division I FCS football season. The Tigers were led by second-year head coach Clarence McKinney and played their home games at a BBVA Compass Stadium in Houston, Texas as members of the West Division of the Southwestern Athletic Conference (SWAC).

On July 20, 2020, the Southwestern Athletic Conference announced that it would not play fall sports due to the COVID-19 pandemic, which includes the football program. The conference is formalizing plans to conduct a competitive schedule for football during the 2021 spring semester.

Previous season
The Tigers finished the 2019 season 0–11, 0–7 in SWAC play to finish in last place in the West Division. The Tigers did not qualify/were not invited to any postseason play.

Preseason

Recruiting class
Reference:

|}

Preseason polls
The SWAC will release their polls in July 2020.

Schedule
The 2020 schedule consists of 1 neutral, 5 home, 5 away games in the regular season. The Tigers will travel to SWAC foes Prairie View A&M, Jackson State, Arkansas–Pine Bluff, and Alabama State. The Tigers will play host to SWAC opponents Houston Baptist, Alabama A&M, Grambling State, and Mississippi Valley State. Texas Southern will travel to Arlington, TX to compete against conference foe Southern in a neutral matchup at AT&T Stadium.

Due to the SWAC's postponement of the 2020 football season to spring 2021, games against Houston Baptist, New Mexico State, and Texas–Permian Basin were canceled. The SWAC released updated spring schedules on August 17.

Game summaries

at Prairie View A&M

Southern

References

Texas Southern
Texas Southern Tigers football seasons
Texas Southern Tigers football